The Cotârgaci is a right tributary of the river Morișca in Romania. It flows into the Morișca in the village Roma.

References

Rivers of Romania
Rivers of Botoșani County